Lombardy elected its forth delegation to the Italian Senate on April 28, 1963. This election was a part of national Italian general election of 1963 even if, according to the Italian Constitution, every senatorial challenge in each Region is a single and independent race.

Lombardy obtained twelve more seats to the Senate, following a constitutional reform.

The election was won by the centrist Christian Democracy, as it happened at national level. Eight Lombard provinces gave a majority or at least a plurality to the winning party, while the agricultural Province of Pavia preferred the Italian Communist Party.

Background
The constitutional reform of 1963 created dozens of new senatorial seats to improve the representation of minor parties, but the proportional voting system did not impose changes into the total number of local constituencies. The result was that Christian Democracy (DC) elected the major part of its nominees even if it was weakened by Amintore Fanfani's program to create a centre-left government with the Italian Socialist Party (PSI). If the DC paid its toll to the centre-right Italian Liberal Party, which obtained great results in the bourgeois centre of Milan, the PSI lost votes to the Italian Communist Party, and later it suffered a crisis losing his leftist wing, including senator Giuseppe Roda, which created the Soviet-aligned Italian Socialist Party of Proletarian Unity.

Electoral system
The electoral system for the Senate was a strange hybrid which established a form of proportional representation into FPTP-like constituencies. A candidate needed a landslide victory of more than 65% of votes to obtain a direct mandate. All constituencies where this result was not reached entered into an at-large calculation based upon the D'Hondt method to distribute the seats between the parties, and candidates with the best percentages of suffrage inside their party list were elected.

Results

|-
|- bgcolor="#E9E9E9"
!rowspan="1" align="left" valign="top"|Party
!rowspan="1" align="center" valign="top"|votes
!rowspan="1" align="center" valign="top"|votes (%)
!rowspan="1" align="center" valign="top"|seats
!rowspan="1" align="center" valign="top"|swing
|-
!align="left" valign="top"|Christian Democracy
|valign="top"|1,757,450
|valign="top"|39.9
|valign="top"|19
|valign="top"|3
|-
!align="left" valign="top"|Italian Communist Party
|valign="top"|910,939
|valign="top"|20.7
|valign="top"|10
|valign="top"|4
|-
!align="left" valign="top"|Italian Socialist Party
|valign="top"|780,648
|valign="top"|17.7
|valign="top"|8
|valign="top"|1
|-
!align="left" valign="top"|Italian Liberal Party
|valign="top"|400,831
|valign="top"|9.1
|valign="top"|4
|valign="top"|3
|-
!align="left" valign="top"|Italian Democratic Socialist Party
|valign="top"|300,841
|valign="top"|6.8
|valign="top"|3
|valign="top"|1
|-
!align="left" valign="top"|Italian Social Movement
|valign="top"|181,387
|valign="top"|4.1
|valign="top"|1
|valign="top"|=
|-
!align="left" valign="top"|Others
|valign="top"|75,939
|valign="top"|1.7
|valign="top"|-
|valign="top"|=
|- bgcolor="#E9E9E9"
!rowspan="1" align="left" valign="top"|Total parties
!rowspan="1" align="right" valign="top"|4,408,035
!rowspan="1" align="right" valign="top"|100.0
!rowspan="1" align="right" valign="top"|45
!rowspan="1" align="right" valign="top"|12
|}

Sources: Italian Ministry of the Interior

Constituencies

|-
|- bgcolor="#E9E9E9"
!align="left" valign="top"|N°
!align="center" valign="top"|Constituency
!align="center" valign="top"|Elected
!align="center" valign="top"|Party
!align="center" valign="top"|Votes %
!align="center" valign="top"|Others
|-
|align="left"|1
|align="left"|Bergamo
|align="left"|Cristoforo Pezzini
|align="left"|Christian Democracy
|align="left"|55.8%
|align="left"|
|-
|align="left"|2
|align="left"|Clusone
|align="left"|Giovanni Zonca
|align="left"|Christian Democracy
|align="left"|66.8%
|align="left"|
|-
|align="left"|3
|align="left"|Treviglio
|align="left"|Daniele Turani
|align="left"|Christian Democracy
|align="left"|61.2%
|align="left"|
|-
|align="left"|4
|align="left"|Brescia
|align="left"|Ludovico Montini
|align="left"|Christian Democracy
|align="left"|43.4%
|align="left"|
|-
|align="left"|5
|align="left"|Breno
|align="left"|Enrico RoselliAlessandro Morino
|align="left"|Christian DemocracyItalian Democratic Socialist Party
|align="left"|56.9%10.8%
|align="left"|
|-
|align="left"|6
|align="left"|Chiari
|align="left"|Pietro Cenini
|align="left"|Christian Democracy
|align="left"|57.0%
|align="left"|
|-
|align="left"|7
|align="left"|Salò
|align="left"|Francesco Zane
|align="left"|Christian Democracy
|align="left"|49.0%
|align="left"|
|-
|align="left"|8
|align="left"|Como
|align="left"|Pasquale ValsecchiBruno Amoletti
|align="left"|Christian DemocracyItalian Socialist Party
|align="left"|40.3%20.0%
|align="left"|
|-
|align="left"|9
|align="left"|Lecco
|align="left"|Pietro Amigoni
|align="left"|Christian Democracy
|align="left"|54.8%
|align="left"|
|-
|align="left"|10
|align="left"|Cantù
|align="left"|Mario MartinelliUgo Bonafini
|align="left"|Christian DemocracyItalian Socialist Party
|align="left"|52.4%19.6%
|align="left"|
|-
|align="left"|11
|align="left"|Cremona
|align="left"|Arnaldo Bera
|align="left"|Italian Communist Party
|align="left"|27.1%
|align="left"|Giovanni Lombardi (DC) 38.1%
|-
|align="left"|12
|align="left"|Crema
|align="left"|Ennio Zelioli
|align="left"|Christian Democracy
|align="left"|51.1%
|align="left"|
|-
|align="left"|13
|align="left"|Mantua
|align="left"|Ernesto ZanardiTullia Romagnoli
|align="left"|Italian Communist PartyItalian Socialist Party
|align="left"|26.5%21.6%
|align="left"|Leonello Zenti (DC) 36.2%
|-
|align="left"|14
|align="left"|Ostiglia
|align="left"|Teodosio AimoniGastone Darè
|align="left"|Italian Communist PartyItalian Socialist Party
|align="left"|34.2%22.8%
|align="left"|Dante Bettoni (DC) 29.7%
|-
|align="left"|15
|align="left"|Milan 1
|align="left"|Giorgio Bergamasco
|align="left"|Italian Liberal Party
|align="left"|29.8% 
|align="left"|
|-
|align="left"|16
|align="left"|Milan 2
|align="left"|Luigi GrassiGastone Nencioni
|align="left"|Italian Liberal PartyItalian Social Movement
|align="left"|27.5%8.4%
|align="left"|
|-
|align="left"|17
|align="left"|Milan 3
|align="left"|Lea Alcidi BoccacciItalo Viglianesi
|align="left"|Italian Liberal PartyItalian Democratic Socialist Party
|align="left"|21.4%10.8%
|align="left"|
|-
|align="left"|18
|align="left"|Milan 4
|align="left"|Vincenzo PalumboEdgardo Lami Starnuti
|align="left"|Italian Liberal PartyItalian Democratic Socialist Party
|align="left"|25.1%9.8%
|align="left"|
|-
|align="left"|19
|align="left"|Milan 5
|align="left"|Ugo Bartesaghi
|align="left"|Italian Communist Party
|align="left"|25.7%
|align="left"|Pietro Caleffi (PSI) 19.8%Antonio Coppi (PLI) 13.0%
|-
|align="left"|20
|align="left"|Milan 6
|align="left"|Piero MontagnaniGiuseppe Roda
|align="left"|Italian Communist PartyItalian Socialist Party
|align="left"|29.1%21.2%
|align="left"|
|-
|align="left"|21
|align="left"|Abbiategrasso
|align="left"|Emanuele Samek LodoviciCarlo Arnaudi
|align="left"|Christian DemocracyItalian Socialist Party
|align="left"|40.8%20.5%
|align="left"|
|-
|align="left"|22
|align="left"|Rho
|align="left"|Tommaso AjroldiGianfranco MarisArialdo Banfi
|align="left"|Christian DemocracyItalian Communist PartyItalian Socialist Party
|align="left"|39.6%26.2%20.4%
|align="left"|
|-
|align="left"|23
|align="left"|Monza
|align="left"|Gianmaria Cornaggia
|align="left"|Christian Democracy
|align="left"|42.9%
|align="left"|
|-
|align="left"|24
|align="left"|Vimercate
|align="left"|Guido Corbellini
|align="left"|Christian Democracy
|align="left"|50.1%
|align="left"|
|-
|align="left"|25
|align="left"|Lodi
|align="left"|Giordano Dell'AmoreFrancesco Scotti
|align="left"|Christian DemocracyItalian Communist Party
|align="left"|42.8%28.1%
|align="left"|
|-
|align="left"|26
|align="left"|Pavia
|align="left"|Pietro Vergani
|align="left"|Italian Communist Party
|align="left"|30.8%
|align="left"|Pietro Ferreri (DC) 28.6%
|-
|align="left"|27
|align="left"|Voghera
|align="left"|Giorgio Piovano
|align="left"|Italian Communist Party
|align="left"|29.6%
|align="left"|Giovanni Celasco (DC) 32.5%
|-
|align="left"|28
|align="left"|Vigevano
|align="left"|Giovanni Brambilla
|align="left"|Italian Communist Party
|align="left"|38.6%
|align="left"|
|-
|align="left"|29
|align="left"|Sondrio
|align="left"|Athos Valsecchi
|align="left"|Christian Democracy
|align="left"|55.9%
|align="left"|
|-
|align="left"|30
|align="left"|Varese
|align="left"|Noè Pajetta
|align="left"|Christian Democracy
|align="left"|39.7%
|align="left"|
|-
|align="left"|31
|align="left"|Busto Arsizio 
|align="left"|Natale SanteroGuido Canziani
|align="left"|Christian DemocracyItalian Socialist Party
|align="left"|43.2%19.6%
|align="left"|
|}

Senators with a direct mandate have bold percentages. Please remember that the electoral system was, in the other cases, a form of proportional representation and not a FPTP race: so candidates winning with a simple plurality could have (and usually had) a candidate (usually a Christian democrat) with more votes in their constituency.

Substitutions
Giovanni Lombardi for Cremona (38.1%) replaced Pietro Amigoni in 1963. Reason: death.
Leonello Zenti for Mantua (36.2%) replaced Giordano Dell'Amore in 1963. Reason: business incompatibility.
Pietro Caleffi for Milan 5 (19.8%) replaced Bruno Amoletti in 1964. Reason: recount.
Giovanni Celasco for Voghera (32.5%) replaced Daniele Turani in 1964. Reason: death.
Dante Bettoni for Ostiglia (29.7%) replaced Enrico Roselli in 1964. Reason: death.
Pietro Ferreri for Pavia (28.6%) replaced Noè Pajetta in 1966. Reason: death.
Antonio Coppi for Milan 5 (13.0%) replaced Luigi Grassi in 1967. Reason: resignation.

Notes

Elections in Lombardy
1963 elections in Italy